Drake is a masculine given name of English origin meaning "Dragon" or "Snake".

Notable people with the given name "Drake" include

A
 Aubrey Drake Graham (born 1986), Canadian musician

B
 Drake Batherson (born 1998), Canadian ice hockey player
 Drake Bell (born 1986), American actor and musician
 Drake Berehowsky (born 1974), Canadian ice hockey player
 Drake Britton (born 1989), American baseball player
 Drake Burnette (born 1985), American actress

C
 Drake Caggiula (born 1994), Canadian ice hockey player
 Drake Callender (born 1998), American soccer player
 Drake Carr (born 1993), American artist

D
 Drake Diener (born 1981), American basketball player
 Drake Doremus (born 1983), American film director
 Drake Dunsmore (born 1988), American football player

E
 Drake Edens (1925–1982), American politician

G
 Drake Garrett (born 1946), American football player

H
 Drake Hogestyn (born 1953), American actor

J
 Drake Jackson (born 2001), American football player
 Drake Jensen (born 1970), Canadian musician

L
 Drake Levin (1946–2009), American musician
 Drake London (born 2001), American football player
 Drake Lubega, Ugandan businessman

M
 Drake Maye (born 2003), American football player
 Drake Maverick (born 1983), English professional wrestler
 Drake McElroy (born 1969), American athlete
 Drake Milligan, American actor

N
 Drake Nevis (born 1989), American football player

O
 Drake Olson (born 1955), American racing driver

R
 Drake Rymsha (born 1998), American ice hockey player

S
 Drake Sather (1959–2004), American comedian

T
 Drake Thadzi (born 1964), Malawian boxer

U
 Drake U'u (born 1990), American-Australian basketball player

W
 Drake White (born 1983), American singer
 Drake Wuertz (born 1984), American professional wrestler

Fictional characters
 Drake Maijstral, a character in novels written by Walter Jon Williams

English masculine given names
English-language masculine given names